= (83) FOR-TRUTH =

American Christian billboard evangelism campaign

(83) FOR-TRUTH is an American Christian billboard evangelism campaign operated by Christian Aid Ministries (CAM). The campaign uses roadside billboards and a toll-free phone number, 83-FOR-TRUTH, to direct callers to religious resources, recorded audio, and biblical answers to questions about Christianity.

The campaign is also called Gospel Billboards. CAM says the program began in November 2006 and is intended to make people “stop and think about God, their relationship with Him, and eternity”.

== History ==
Christian Aid Ministries says its billboard evangelism program began in November 2006. The organization says it has posted thousands of gospel messages across the United States and that the campaign receives phone calls from people seeking religious help or information.

== Campaign format ==
The billboards typically use short questions or statements rather than long messages. Examples on the campaign’s website include “Is there evidence for God?”, “Where is your allegiance?”, “Is evolution a myth?”, and “Have you considered eternity?”

CAM says the billboards are intended to prompt reflection and direct interested people to further resources through its website and toll-free number.

== Reception ==
=== Positive views ===
Supporters say the campaign gives people a simple way to encounter Christian messages in public spaces and to seek follow-up resources. CAM says thousands of people call the toll-free number and that the campaign logged more than 77,000 calls in 2024. CAM also highlights stories of callers who say the billboards encouraged them to search for faith or spiritual answers.

A 2024 article in Billboard Insider described the ministry as spending millions of dollars annually on its billboard work and noted that the organization sees the signs as part of a broader outreach effort tied to donations and phone follow-up.

=== Negative views ===
Critics have questioned the tone and effectiveness of the campaign. Forward described the billboards as using a more forceful, fire-and-brimstone style than some other religious advertisements, noting that the signs often use references to God, the Bible, or “Truth”.

Academic research on religious outdoor advertising has also raised doubts about whether such messages change behaviour. A study in the Online Journal of Communication and Media Technologies found a ceiling effect among participants and reported that most did not change their religious habits after exposure to the messages.
